Bledisloe was an ancient hundred of Gloucestershire, England.  It comprised the ancient parishes of
Alvington
Awre
Lydney

The hundred was named after the hamlet of Bledisloe, once a tithing of the parish of Awre and now a hamlet north of Lydney on the A48 road, where the hundred met.  The meeting place was a mound known as Bledisloe Tump.

At the time of the Domesday Book the hundred included Awre manor, Bledisloe, Etloe, Purton and Nass.  Alvington (previously a detached part of Herefordshire) and Lydney joined the hundred by 1221.

References

External links 
The National Gazetteer of Great Britain and Ireland (1868)

Hundreds of Gloucestershire
Forest of Dean